John Singleton, (1776 – 1802) was an English horse racing jockey of the late 18th and early 19th century.  He was actually the third John Singleton from the same family to achieve prominence in racing circles, following his father John and his great uncle John.

His father John married the daughter of the groom at his master Lord Rockingham's stud.  Singleton was the product of this marriage and was born in France. He was being lined up to go into a medical career, under the tutelage of his maternal uncle who was a surgeon in Sheffield. Instead, he ran away to Newmarket to the stables of the Duke of Bedford.

For Bedford, Singleton rode to victory in three British Classic Races - the 1791 Oaks on Portia (aged just, the 1793 Oaks on Caelia and, his most famous victory, the 1797 Derby on an unnamed colt by Fidget.  Back in his family's native Yorkshire he also won the 1802 St. Leger on Orville for Lord Fitzwilliam, who had inherited the estates of his uncle, Lord Rockingham, the man who had provided Singleton's father and great uncle with so many of their victories, and also employed his maternal grandfather as stud groom.

Singleton died two months later at the age of 26, "highly respected, esteemed and lamented" by the Newmarket racing community.

Major wins 
 Great Britain
Epsom Derby - Colt by Fidget (1797)
Epsom Oaks - Portia (1791), Caelia (1793)
St Leger - Orville (1802)

References

Bibliography 
 
 

1776 births
1802 deaths
English jockeys